Singapore participated in the 1982 Asian Games held in New Delhi, India from 19 November to 4 December 1982. Singapore ranked 16th with 1 gold and 2 bronze medals with a total of 3 over-all medals.

Singapore sent 64 athletes to compete in New Delhi. National water polo team coach, Tan Eng Bock, was assigned as chef de mission for the contingent. On the eve of the games, Tan revealed the target of meeting the same number of medals at the 1978 Asian Games, two golds, one bronze and four silver medals.

Medalists

Field Hockey

Women's tournament

Water polo 

Summary

Men's tournament 
Group B

Semifinals

Bronze medal match

References

Nations at the 1982 Asian Games
1982
Asian Games